The Guinean Football Federation is the governing body of football in Guinea. It was founded in 1959, affiliated to FIFA and to CAF in 1962. It organizes the national football league and the national team.

References

External links
 Official website
 Guinea at the FIFA website.
 Guinea at CAF Online

Guinea
Football in Guinea
Sports organizations established in 1960
Football